Wild Cargo is a 1934 jungle adventure documentary starring Frank Buck. Buck depicts the ingenious methods by which he traps wild birds, mammals and reptiles. Many scenes were photographed on the vast Malayan estates of Buck's friend, Sultan Ibrahim of Johor, who appears in person in the film.

Scenes
Among the scenes in the film are: 
a python's escape from its box; Buck recaptures the giant snake.
a fight to the death between a black panther and a python in which the python comes off victorious
Buck traps a man-eating tiger
a python crawls in between the bars of a pig pen and swallows the pig; the snake has imprisoned itself, for with the pig inside it, it could not extricate itself from the pen
a python attacks Buck in the jungle, and Buck must shoot the huge snake to save his own life
a king cobra escapes from its box and attacks Buck

Behind the camera

Cameraman Leroy G. Phelps was nearly crippled by an infection he acquired after scratching himself on a poisonous renghus plant. Buck and Phelps were almost trampled by a herd of stampeding water buffalo; they were spared only when the animals changed direction at the last moment.

Reception
According to The New York Times, "Although it may seem as though several incidents in the screen work were prearranged, they are nevertheless quite thrilling."

The film earned RKO a profit of $100,000. The film was a box office disappointment for RKO.

References

Bibliography

External links
 

1934 films
1934 adventure films
American black-and-white films
American adventure films
1934 documentary films
American documentary films
1930s English-language films
1930s American films